Victoria Street railway station is a heritage-listed railway station located on the Main Northern line in New South Wales, Australia. It serves the Victoria Street area of East Maitland. It was added to the New South Wales State Heritage Register on 2 April 1999.

History

It opened on 5 April 1857.

It is in about the same location as the first East Maitland station and marked the temporary terminus of the railway from Newcastle while the bridge over Wallis Creek was built. From 1906 to 1926 it was also an interchange station with the steam tramway line that ran from West to East Maitland.

The present building was built in 1877 and in 1914 the single platform was converted to an island platform and a footbridge added when the line was duplicated. The station footbridge was added along with the island conversion in 1914.

From 2017 to 2018, under the Transport Access Program, Victoria Street Station received three new lifts, new canopies and signage, bike racks and improvements to the interchange areas.

Platforms & services
Victoria Street has one island platform with two faces. It is serviced by NSW TrainLink Hunter Line services travelling from Newcastle to Maitland, Muswellbrook, Scone, Telarah and Dungog.

Transport links
Hunter Valley Buses operate five routes via Victoria Street station:
181: Woodberry to Rutherford
182: Rutherford to Thornton
183: Regiment Road to Tenambit
184: Maitland to Chambers Street
188: Stockland Green Hills to Woodlands Estate

Heritage listing 
Victoria Street station is one of the oldest station buildings surviving in the Newcastle area. The site was the terminus of the line from Newcastle when it opened in 1857 until extension to the present Maitland railway station one year later. It has been adapted to an island platform form for the duplication where most of the stations on the line were rebuilt. Because of its age and as a remnant of the early line it is of high significance. The footbridge supports the group.

Victoria Street railway station was listed on the New South Wales State Heritage Register on 2 April 1999 having satisfied the following criteria.

The place possesses uncommon, rare or endangered aspects of the cultural or natural history of New South Wales.

This item is assessed as historically rare. This item is assessed as scientifically rare. This item is assessed as arch. rare. This item is assessed as socially rare.

References

Attribution

External links

Victoria Street station details Transport for New South Wales

Easy Access railway stations in New South Wales
East Maitland, New South Wales
Railway stations in the Hunter Region
Railway stations in Australia opened in 1877
Regional railway stations in New South Wales
New South Wales State Heritage Register
Main North railway line, New South Wales